The Jefferson Warrior Railroad  was a terminal railroad as reported by the AAR. The JEFW began in 1895 as the Marylee Railroad took its current name in 1985. The railroad was taken over by Watco and renamed the Alabama Warrior Railway in 2009.

References

Brotherhood of Locomotive Engineers

Alabama railroads
Switching and terminal railroads